Katie or Katy Douglas may refer to:

Katie Douglas (basketball), retired American professional basketball player
Katie Douglas (actress) (born 1998), Canadian actress
Katy Douglas (cousin of James I), cousin and protector of James I of Scotland

See also
Kate Douglas (disambiguation)
Katherine Douglas (disambiguation)
Kitty Douglas, Duchess of Queensberry